Falkland Pursuivant of Arms is a Scottish pursuivant of arms of the Court of the Lord Lyon.

The title was first mentioned in 1493 and it is derived from the Royal Palace of the same name located in Fife. The title is often used for a Pursuivant Extraordinary: an officer who is not part of the ordinary complement of the Court but is called to duty when needed.

The badge of office is A stag lodged reguardant Gules, gorged of a coronet of four fleur-de-lys (two visible) and four crosses pattee (one and two halves visible) Or.

The office is currently held by Colin C. Russell.

Holders of the office

See also
Officer of Arms
Pursuivant
Court of the Lord Lyon
Heraldry Society of Scotland

References

External links
The Court of the Lord Lyon



Court of the Lord Lyon
Offices of arms